Markus Keller (born 6 December 1982 in Bottighofen) is a Swiss snowboarder. He competed in the men's halfpipe event at the 2006 Winter Olympics, placing seventh, and the 2010 Winter Olympics, placing 29th.

Keller appeared in a short film for Red Bull TV, titled 'CHAMäLEON'.

References

1982 births
Living people
Swiss male snowboarders
Olympic snowboarders of Switzerland
Snowboarders at the 2006 Winter Olympics
Snowboarders at the 2010 Winter Olympics
Sportspeople from Thurgau
21st-century Swiss people